Hjärtats trakt – en samling was released on 10 September 1997 and is a compilation album from Swedish pop artist Per Gessle, who was one half of the duo Roxette. EMI released this low price album as a part of a whole series of albums by Swedish artists, and the CDs were mainly supposed to be sold at gas stations and convenience stores.

Track list
"På väg"
"Hjärtats trakt"
"Rickie Lee"
"Inte tillsammans, inte isär"
"Indiansommar" (instrumental)
"Blå december"
"Den tunna linjen"
"Timmar av iver"
"Tända en sticka till"
"Ros"
"När morgonen kommer"
"Speedo"
"Om jag en dag"

References

External links
[ Billboard.com]

1997 compilation albums
Per Gessle compilation albums
Swedish-language compilation albums